Martin Haftmann (16 July 1899 – 23 July 1961) was a German international footballer.

References

1899 births
1961 deaths
Association football forwards
German footballers
Germany international footballers